Ja'Aluni Airport  is an airport serving Duqm, an Arabian Sea port in the Al Wusta Governorate of Oman.

The runway length does not include a  displaced threshold on Runway 21.

See also

Transport in Oman
List of airports in Oman

References

External links
OpenStreetMap - Ja'Aluni Airport
HERE Maps - Ja'Aluni
OurAirports - Ja'Aluni Airport

Airports in Oman